Cody Lake, or Lake Cody, may refer to:

 Cody Lake (Minnesota), a lake in Minnesota, USA
 Lake Cody (Quebec), a lake in Quebec, Canada